Schöneberg is a village and a former municipality in the Uckermark district, in Brandenburg, Germany. Since January 2021 it is part of the city of Schwedt/Oder.

Demography

References

Localities in Uckermark (district)
Former municipalities in Brandenburg